is the fourth solo single from J-pop vocalist Tomiko Van, released on June 18, 2008. The track "Hum a Tune" is a cover of a song by Japanese band Original Love. "Message." is said to be Van's first musical composition, and "Tokyo Biyori" is said to be composed by Kazuo Zaitsu of Tulip.

Track listing
 
 "Message."
 "Hum a Tune"
 
 "Message." (Instrumental)

References

2008 singles
Tomiko Van songs
2008 songs
Avex Trax singles
Song recordings produced by Sin (music producer)